Katherine "Katie" Reinprecht (born November 1, 1989) is an American field hockey player who participated in the 2012 and 2016 Summer Olympics. She competed for the United States women's national field hockey team in the 2012 and 2016 field hockey events.

Biography 
Reinprecht was born in Philadelphia. She graduated from Mount Saint Joseph Academy high school in 2008 and went on to attend Princeton University. She took a year off from her college education to train for the 2012 Summer Olympics. When she returned to school, she helped lead the Tigers to their first-ever NCAA Field Hockey National Championship, and then was awarded the Honda Sports Award for field hockey. Her younger sister, Julia, also played field hockey for Princeton and the 2012 and 2016 U.S. Olympic field hockey teams.

She is currently sponsored by Ritual Hockey.

See also
 List of Princeton University Olympians

References

External links
 

1989 births
Living people
American female field hockey players
Olympic field hockey players of the United States
Field hockey players at the 2012 Summer Olympics
Field hockey players at the 2016 Summer Olympics
Field hockey players at the 2011 Pan American Games
Princeton Tigers field hockey players
Pan American Games gold medalists for the United States
Pan American Games medalists in field hockey
Medalists at the 2011 Pan American Games